The now-called Miss Earth Philippines 2018, formerly titled Miss Philippines Earth up until the prior year, was the 18th edition of Miss Earth Philippines pageant. Formerly titled Miss Philippines Earth up until the preceding edition, it was held on May 19, 2018, at the Mall of Asia Arena in Pasay, Philippines. Karen Ibasco of Manila crowned Celeste Cortesi of Fil-Rome, Italy at the end of the event. Cortesi represented the Philippines at the Miss Earth 2018 pageant and placed Top 8.

Results
Color keys

Category Results
 Top 10 scorers of each preliminary rounds

Pre-Pageant Events

Awards

Special Awards

Other Sponsors Awards

Delegates
The following is the list of the official delegates of Miss Earth Philippines 2018 representing various cities, municipalities, provinces, and Filipino communities abroad.

References

2018
2018 beauty pageants
2018 in the Philippines